Strub is a last name of German origin, and may refer to:

Emil Strub (1858–1909), Swiss railway builder and inventor of the Strub rack system
Charles H. Strub (1884–1958), American dentist and entrepreneur
Joseph Strub (1833–1890), Spiritan Roman Catholic priest who founded Duquesne University in Pittsburgh, Pennsylvania
Sean Strub (born 1958), American writer and activist

See also
Gustav Strube (1867–1953), German-American composer
Straub

German-language surnames